Amorous Anathema is the debut studio album by the Swedish melodic black metal band Embraced released in 1998 on Regain Records. It was recorded in November 1997 at Studio Fredman and mastered at Masteringroom. In 2003 Regain Records re-released the album with two bonus tracks recorded during the Within session.

Track listing

Personnel
Kalle Johansson - vocals, didgeridoo on "The End... And Here We All Die"
Daniel Lindberg - drums
Julius Chmielewski - keyboards
Sven Karlsson - keyboards, piano, mastering
Michael Håkansson - bass, vocals, mastering, cover art and layout concept
Davor Tepic - guitars
Peter Mårdklint - guitars

Additional personnel
Kalle Metz - additional vocals on "The Beautiful Flow of an Autumn Passion"
Lasse Hejll - photography
Helene Toresdotter - cover art, photography
Göran Finnberg - mastering
Anders Fridén - producer, mixing
Fredrik Nordström - engineering
Ron Boldsurfer - logo

External links
Amorous Anathema at Allmusic

1998 debut albums
Embraced albums
Black metal albums by Swedish artists
Albums recorded at Studio Fredman
Regain Records albums